
Littlebury Green  is a village in the civil parish of Littlebury and the district of Uttlesford in Essex, England.

Littlebury Green is one of three settlements, the others Catmere End and Chapel Green, at the west and south-west of Littlebury parish, and subordinate to the parish village of Littlebury near the north-east border with the parish of Saffron Walden.

History

During Roman Britain, Littlebury Green was named 'Stretley' after its position on the Ermine Street route towards Chesterford. A 16th-century will bequeathed a house at "Strelly Green commonly called Littlebury Green". White's Directory mentions the Roman road and of records referring to the settlement as 'Streetly Green'

In 1851 Littlebury Green comprised 32 houses, including two beer-houses. By 2008 the village contained 53 houses.

A small chapel of ease, built in 1885 by subscription and dedicated to St Peter, held seating for 150. One of the principal landowners was Lord Braybrooke who was also lord of the manor. Within the village were two public houses, the Rose Inn and the Hoops Inn, and in 1933, also a tobacconist.

Governance
Local governance for the parish, including Littlebury Green, is served by Littlebury Parish Council.

Landmarks
Apart from St Peter's chapel of ease, there are six Grade II listed buildings in Littlebury Green: the former Hoops public house, a timber-framed house dating to the 17th century; the adjacent Green Farmhouse, a c.1600 two-storey timber-framed and plastered house, with adjoining brick barn; Caitlin's Farmhouse, a c.1600 timber-framed and plastered house with brick-faced bottom storey; and Howe Hall, a 19th-century brick house with its adjoining 18th- 19th-century timber-framed and plastered dovecote.

References

External links
 

Villages in Essex
Uttlesford